"Haven't Had Enough" is a song recorded by Canadian pop punk band Marianas Trench for their third studio album, Ever After (2011). It was released July 19, 2011 as the album's lead single. The song debuted at #9 on the Canadian Hot 100 and was certified Platinum by Music Canada in December 2011; it was later certified 2× Platinum in October 2016.

Background and composition
The band released a couple of teasers of the song via their YouTube channel prior to the release of the single.

"Haven't Had Enough" is primarily a pop song, with additional influences of pop rock guitars and 80's funk. It was written and produced solely by Marianas Trench lead singer Josh Ramsay. The Magazine called the song "somewhat different" from their previous material, but noted that it still has a distinctive "Marianas Trench feel".

Music video
A music video for the song was filmed on July 20 in Burnaby, British Columbia. A teaser for the video was released on August 8, 2011. The music video premiered on MuchMusic on August 25, 2011 and was uploaded to the band's official Vevo channel the next day on August 26. Directed by Kyle Davison, it is the first chapter in a five-video storyline accompanying the album's backstory, and is followed by "Fallout".

Chart performance
"Haven't Had Enough" reached #1 on the iTunes download chart in Canada. The song debuted on the Canadian Hot 100 at #9 for the week of August 6, 2011, the highest debut by Marianas Trench as well as the band's first top ten hit on the chart. It was also a radio hit, reaching a peak of 24 and 13, respectively, on the Nielsen Broadcast Data Systems Canada CHR and Hot AC surveys.

Track listing

Charts and certifications

Weekly charts

Year-end chart

Certifications

Awards and nominations

References

2011 singles
2011 songs
604 Records singles
Songs written by Josh Ramsay
Marianas Trench (band) songs